Margaret Thatcher became the first female Leader of the Conservative Party and Leader of the Opposition after winning the 1975 leadership election, the first Conservative leadership election where the post was not vacant. A rule change to enable the election was largely prompted by dissatisfaction with the incumbent leader, Edward Heath, who had lost three of four general elections as leader, including two in 1974. After announcing her first Shadow Cabinet in February 1975, she reshuffled it twice: in January and November 1976. Minor subsequent changes were necessary to respond to various circumstances. Thatcher's Shadow Cabinet ceased to exist upon her becoming Prime Minister following the 1979 general election.

Shadow Cabinet list

Initial Shadow Cabinet
Thatcher announced her first Shadow Cabinet on 18 February 1975.
 Margaret Thatcher – Leader of Her Majesty's Most Loyal Opposition and Leader of the Conservative Party
 William Whitelaw – Deputy Leader of the Opposition and Shadow Minister responsible for Devolution
 Keith Joseph – Shadow Minister with responsibility for policy formation and research
 Lord Hailsham of St Marylebone – Shadow Minister without Portfolio
 Reginald Maudling – Shadow Foreign Secretary
 Geoffrey Howe – Shadow Chancellor of the Exchequer
 Ian Gilmour – Shadow Home Secretary
 Lord Carrington – Leader of the Opposition in the House of Lords
 Jim Prior – Shadow Secretary of State for Employment
 Francis Pym – Shadow Minister of Agriculture, Fisheries and Food
 Patrick Jenkin – Shadow Secretary of State for Energy
 John Peyton – Shadow Leader of the House of Commons
 Norman St John-Stevas – Shadow Secretary of State for Education and Science and Shadow Minister for the Arts
 Michael Heseltine – Shadow Secretary of State for Industry
 Timothy Raison – Shadow Secretary of State for the Environment
 Alick Buchanan-Smith – Shadow Secretary of State for Scotland
 Nicholas Edwards – Shadow Secretary of State for Wales
 Airey Neave – Shadow Secretary of State for Northern Ireland
 George Younger – Shadow Secretary of State for Defence
 Norman Fowler – Shadow Secretary of State for Health
 Sally Oppenheim – Shadow Secretary of State for Prices and Consumer Protection
 Humphrey Atkins – Opposition Chief Whip in the House of Commons
 Lord St Aldwyn – Opposition Chief Whip in the House of Lords
 Sir Michael Havers – Shadow Attorney General

Changes
 April 1975: Due to illness, Pym was replaced as Shadow Agriculture Minister by Michael Jopling.

January 1976 reshuffle
On 15 January 1976, Thatcher reshuffled the Shadow Cabinet. Pym returned as Shadow Agriculture Minister, displacing Jopling.  George Younger was dropped from the front bench, and he was replaced by Gilmour at Defence; Whitelaw, the Deputy Leader, added Gilmour's Home Affairs portfolio to his Devolution. John Biffen replaced Jenkin as Shadow Energy Secretary, and Jenkin took Health from Fowler, who was demoted to be a Shadow Transport Minister (which was not in Shadow Cabinet and was part of the Environment team).
 Margaret Thatcher – Leader of Her Majesty's Most Loyal Opposition and Leader of the Conservative Party
 William Whitelaw – Deputy Leader of the Opposition, Shadow Home Secretary and Shadow Minister responsible for Devolution
 Keith Joseph – Shadow Minister with responsibility for policy formation and research
 Lord Hailsham of St Marylebone – Shadow Minister without Portfolio
 Reginald Maudling – Shadow Foreign Secretary
 Geoffrey Howe – Shadow Chancellor of the Exchequer
 Ian Gilmour – Shadow Secretary of State for Defence
 Lord Carrington – Leader of the Opposition in the House of Lords
 Jim Prior – Shadow Secretary of State for Employment
 Francis Pym – Shadow Minister of Agriculture, Fisheries and Food
 John Biffen – Shadow Secretary of State for Energy
 John Peyton – Shadow Leader of the House of Commons
 Norman St John-Stevas – Shadow Secretary of State for Education and ScienceShadow Minister for the Arts
 Michael Heseltine – Shadow Secretary of State for Industry
 Timothy Raison – Shadow Secretary of State for the Environment
 Alick Buchanan-Smith – Shadow Secretary of State for Scotland
 Nicholas Edwards – Shadow Secretary of State for Wales
 Airey Neave – Shadow Secretary of State for Northern Ireland
 Patrick Jenkin – Shadow Secretary of State for Health
 Sally Oppenheim – Shadow Secretary of State for Prices and Consumer Protection
 Humphrey Atkins – Opposition Chief Whip in the House of Commons
 Lord St Aldwyn – Opposition Chief Whip in the House of Lords
 Sir Michael Havers – Shadow Attorney General

November 1976 reshuffle
On 19 November 1976, Thatcher reshuffled again. Maudling was dropped as Shadow Foreign Secretary and replaced by John Davies. Raison dropped, being replaced at Environment by Heseltine, who was replaced at the Industry portfolio by Biffen. He was in turn replaced as Shadow Energy Secretary by Tom King. Peyton and Pym switch roles (Shadow Leader of the House for Agriculture), with Pym also taking Devolution from Whitelaw.

 Margaret Thatcher – Leader of Her Majesty's Most Loyal Opposition and Leader of the Conservative Party
 William Whitelaw – Deputy Leader of the Opposition and Shadow Home Secretary
 Keith Joseph – Shadow Minister with responsibility for policy formation and research
 Lord Hailsham of St Marylebone – Shadow Minister without Portfolio
 John Davies – Shadow Foreign Secretary
 Geoffrey Howe – Shadow Chancellor of the Exchequer
 Ian Gilmour – Shadow Secretary of State for Defence
 Lord Carrington – Leader of the Opposition in the House of Lords
 Jim Prior – Shadow Secretary of State for Employment
 John Peyton – Shadow Minister of Agriculture, Fisheries and Food
 Tom King – Shadow Secretary of State for Energy
 Francis Pym – Shadow Leader of the House of Commons and Shadow Minister responsible for Devolution
 Norman St John-Stevas – Shadow Secretary of State for Education and Science and Shadow Minister for the Arts
 John Biffen – Shadow Secretary of State for Industry
 Michael Heseltine – Shadow Secretary of State for the Environment
 Alick Buchanan-Smith – Shadow Secretary of State for Scotland
 Nicholas Edwards – Shadow Secretary of State for Wales
 Airey Neave – Shadow Secretary of State for Northern Ireland
 Patrick Jenkin – Shadow Secretary of State for Health
 Sally Oppenheim – Shadow Secretary of State for Prices and Consumer Protection
 Humphrey Atkins – Opposition Chief Whip in the House of Commons
 Lord St Aldwyn – Opposition Chief Whip in the House of Lords
 Sir Michael Havers – Shadow Attorney General
Changes
 9 December 1976: Buchanan-Smith is sacked as Shadow Scottish Secretary for failing to adhere to collective responsibility on devolution policy and is replaced by Teddy Taylor, who had been Shadow Trade Secretary, a role that appears not to have belonged to the Shadow Cabinet at this point.
 Approx. 17 January 1978: Lord St Aldwyn retires as Conservative Chief Whip and is replaced by Lord Denham.
 November 1978: On 6 November, John Davies retires from public life after being diagnosed with a brain tumor. Pym is tapped to stand in for him, and is later given the post of Shadow Foreign Secretary full-time. St John-Stevas replaces him Shadow Leader of the House, and Mark Carlisle replaced the latter as Shadow Education Secretary.
 March 1979: Shadow Northern Ireland Secretary Airey Neave is killed by an Irish National Liberation Army car bomb, just over a week before Parliament is dissolved ahead of the 1979 general election.

See also

References

Conservative Party (UK)-related lists
Margaret Thatcher
Official Opposition (United Kingdom)
1975 establishments in the United Kingdom
1979 disestablishments in the United Kingdom
British shadow cabinets
1975 in British politics